List of rivers in Acre (Brazilian State).

The list is arranged by drainage basin, with respective tributaries indented under each larger stream's name and ordered from downstream to upstream. Acre is located entirely within the Amazon Basin.

By Drainage Basin 

 Amazon River (Pará, Amazonas)
 Madeira River (Amazonas, Rondônia)
 Abunã River
 Xipamanu River
 Iná River
 Purus River
 Ituxi River (Iquiri River)
 Acre River
 Antimary River
 Andirá River
 Branco River
 Espalha River
 Xapuri River
 Iaco River
 Caeté River
 Macauã River
 Igarapé Riozinho
 Chandless River
 Igarapé Cochichá
 Igarapé Sindrichal
 Santa Rosa River
 Chambuiaco River
 Juruá River
 Tarauacá River
 Envira River
 Jurupari River
 Igarapé Paraná
 Rio Jaminauá
 Acurauá River
 Muru River
 Jordão River
 Gregório River
 Liberdade River
 Moa River
 Azul River
 Do Moura River (Paraná da Viúva River)
 Valparaiso River
 Juruá-Mirim River
 Igarapé Humaitá
 Igarapé Natal
 Ouro River
 Das Minas River
 Grajaú River
 Paratari River
 Amônia River
 Arara River
 Tejo River
 Bagé River
 Acuriá River
 Igarapé Caipora
 Igarapé São João
 Breu River

Alphabetically 

 Abunã River
 Acre River
 Acurauá River
 Acuriá River
 Amônia River
 Andirá River
 Arara River
 Antimary River
 Azul River
 Bagé River
 Branco River
 Breu River
 Caeté River
 Igarapé Caipora
 Chambuiaco River
 Chandless River
 Igarapé Cochichá
 Envira River
 Espalha River
 Grajaú River
 Gregório River
 Igarapé Humaitá
 Iaco River
 Iná River
 Ituxi River (Iquiri River)
 Jaminauá River
 Jordão River
 Juruá River
 Juruá-Mirim River
 Jurupari River
 Liberdade River
 Macauã River
 Das Minas River
 Moa River
 Do Moura River (Paraná da Viúva River)
 Muru River
 Igarapé Natal
 Ouro River
 Igarapé Paraná
 Paratari River
 Purus River
 Igarapé Riozinho
 Santa Rosa River
 Igarapé São João
 Igarapé Sindrichal
 Tarauacá River
 Tejo River
 Valparaiso River
 Xapuri River
 Xipamanu River

References
 Map from Ministry of Transport

 
Acre
Environment of Acre (state)